Liberty is the name of some places in the U.S. state of Wisconsin:
Liberty, Grant County, Wisconsin, a town
Liberty, Manitowoc County, Wisconsin, a town
Liberty, Outagamie County, Wisconsin, a town
Liberty, Vernon County, Wisconsin, a town
Liberty (community), Wisconsin, an unincorporated community in Vernon County

See also
Liberty Pole, Wisconsin, an unincorporated community